Klenová is a village and municipality in Snina District in the Prešov Region of north-eastern Slovakia.

History
In historical records the village was first mentioned in 1548.

Geography
The municipality lies at an altitude of 255 metres and covers an area of 20.032 km2. It has a population of about 540 people.

References

External links
 
 
https://web.archive.org/web/20071006173841/http://www.statistics.sk/mosmis/eng/run.html

Villages and municipalities in Snina District
Zemplín (region)